Carlos Daniel Chavez-Taffur Schmidt born 1960 in Lima is a Peruvian diplomat, who is ambassador in Tel Aviv since 16 May 2019.

On January 1, 1983, he entered the Foreign Service.
On January 1, 2016, he was appointed ambassador.

Chávez-Taffur was employed in Caracas and Madrid.
He was consul of Peru in Madrid, Spain; at the Consulate General of Peru in Boston, United States of America.
He was employed in Ottawa, Brussels and Santiago de Chile.

Education
He is Master of Arts of public administration of the John F. Kennedy School of Government Harvard University and has a Magister degree in  public administration of the Instituto Universitario de Investigación Ortega y Gasset of the Complutense University of Madrid.

References

1960 births
Living people
Ambassadors of Peru to Israel
Complutense University of Madrid alumni
Harvard Kennedy School alumni